Robert Adam Campbell was an Ontario businessman and political figure. He represented Renfrew South in the Legislative Assembly of Ontario from 1894 to 1899 as a Liberal member.

He was the son of Robert Campbell, who represented the same riding in the House of Commons. Campbell was a lumber merchant in Eganville.

External links 
The Canadian parliamentary companion, 1897 JA Gemmill

Ontario Liberal Party MPPs
Year of birth missing
Year of death missing